Honeycreeper is an album by Japanese pop band PUFFY that was released on September 26, 2007 in Japan. The album is notable for being the first Puffy album where "band Godfather", Andy Sturmer, is not credited for writing any of the songs.

"Hasan Jauze" is a cover of a song by The Cro-Magnons, which was released within two weeks' time of the original.

Current pressings of the album now have the cover that is used as the first pressing's tray liner picture. The first pressings of the album also had extra pages in the CD jacket booklet as well as differences in photo/lyric set-outs.

Puffy have said in an interview that inspiration for the album's title name, 'Honeycreeper', came from a leaflet they had come across while on a vacation in Hawaii, and that it was the name for a type of bird, similar to the ones seen on the album's cover.

Track listing

 "オリエンタル・ダイヤモンド" (Oriental Diamond) (Yosui Inoue/Tamio Okuda) - 4:04
 "Ain't Gonna Cut It" (Butch Walker & Robert Schwartzman) - 2:51
 "君とオートバイ" (Kimi to Otobai/You and the Motorbike) (Yusuke Chiba) - 4:14
 "くちびるモーション" (Kuchibiru Motion/Lip Motion) (Yoshii Kazuya) - 4:02
 "はやいクルマ" (Hayai Kuruma/Fast Car) (Masatoshi Mashima) - 3:43
 "サヨナラサマー" (Sayonara Samaa/So Long, Summer) (Sawao Yamanaka) - 4:16
 "Boom Boom Beat" (Anders Hellgren & David Myhr) - 3:19
 "妖怪PUFFY" (Youkai PUFFY/Ghost PUFFY) (Kankurou Kudou/Taku Tomizawa) - 7:06
 "Closet Full Of Love" (Butch Walker & Kara DioGuardi) - 2:58
 "はさんじゃうぜ" (Hasan Jauze) (Masatoshi Mashima) - 2:48
 "Complaint" (Sawao Yamanaka) - 2:58
 "お江戸流れ星IV" (O Edo Nagareboshi IV/Oh Edo Shooting Star IV) (Pierre Taki/Anders Hellgren & David Myhr) - 3:48
 "アイランド" (Airando/Island) (Yusuke Chiba) - 4:48

Scrapped Tracks 
 "Clearance" (Leaked on the Internet two weeks before "Honeycreeper" official release)  - 4:22
 "Nothing There" (Only an instrumental and a demo by another male singer)  - 3:10
 "Moon/Sun" (Set to be released, cancelled)  - 4:01
 "Forget How My Voice Sounds" (Instrumental version leaked, unknown real name, a fan name was given)  - 4:57

External links
 Jrawk review of the album

References

Puffy AmiYumi albums
2007 albums